"My Generation" is a song by The Who.

My Generation may also refer to:

Film and TV
 My Generation (1996 film), an Italian drama by Wilma Labate
 My Generation (2000 film), an American documentary by Barbara Kopple
 My Generation (2017 film), a documentary about cultural changes in England in the 1960s
 My Generation (TV series), a 2010 American drama
 My Generation (game show), a music game show on VH1

Music
 My Generation (album), a 1965 album by the Who
 My Generation: The Very Best of The Who (1996)
 Sakura Gakuin 2012 Nendo: My Generation, a 2013 album by Sakura Gakuin

Songs
 "My Generation" (Limp Bizkit song) (2000)
 "My Generation" (Yui song) (2007)
 "My Generation", a 2010 song by Nas and Damian Marley from Distant Relatives
 "My Generation", a 2006 song by Starfield from Beauty in the Broken

Other uses
 MyGeneration, a code generation tool